Bremen is a city in northwestern Germany.

Bremen may also refer to:

Places and states

Germany 
 Bremen (state), a federal state in Germany
 Archdiocese of Bremen, a Catholic archdiocese (787–1566), predecessor of the Prince-Archbishopric of Bremen
 Prince-Archbishopric of Bremen, a historical state to the north of the city (1180–1648)
 Duchy of Bremen, a historical state created on the secularization of the archbishopric in 1648
 Bremen (Geisa), a district in the city of Geisa, Wartburgkreis, Thuringia
 Bremen I, an electoral constituency in the Bundestag

United States 
 Bremen, Alabama, an unincorporated town
 Bremen, Georgia, a city
 Bremen, Jo Daviess County, Illinois, an unincorporated community
 Bremen, Randolph County, Illinois, an unincorporated community
 Bremen Township, Cook County, Illinois
 Bremen Precinct, Randolph County, Illinois
 Bremen, Indiana, a town
 Bremen, Kansas, an unincorporated community
 Bremen, Kentucky, a home rule-class city
 Bremen, Maine, a town
 Bremen, North Dakota, an unincorporated community
 Bremen, Ohio, a village
 Bremen Township, Pine County, Minnesota

Elsewhere 
 Bremen Island, Antarctica
 Bremen, Saskatchewan, Canada, an unincorporated community
 Bremen Soviet Republic, a short-lived, unrecognized state in 1919

People 
 Barry Bremen (1947–2011), American imposter of sports figures
 Wiel Bremen (1925–2014), Dutch politician
 Adam of Bremen (German: Adam von Bremen) (before 1050–1081/1085), German medieval chronicler
 Wilhelmina von Bremen (1909–1976), American sprinter

Arts and entertainment 
 Bremen (album), a 2015 studio album by Kenshi Yonezu
 Bremen, a manga series by Haruto Umezawa
 Bremen (Shannara), a character from the Shannara series of novels by Terry Brooks

German Navy ships 
 SMS Bremen, a Bremen-class light cruiser, launched 1903
 Bremen (German submarine), a World War I merchant submarine
 V 302 Bremen a World War II vorpostenboot
 Bremen-class frigate, a German Navy ship class
 German frigate Bremen (F207), a Bremen-class frigate

Transportation

Passenger ships 
 SS Bremen (1858), an ocean liner of Norddeutscher Lloyd
 SS Bremen (1896), an ocean liner of  Norddeutscher Lloyd
 USS Pocahontas (ID-3044), originally SS Prinzess Irene, an ocean liner of Norddeutscher Lloyd named SS Bremen between 1922 and 1928
 SS Bremen (1928), an ocean liner of Norddeutscher Lloyd 
 SS Bremen (1957), an ocean liner; formerly SS Pasteur
 MS Bremen, a cruise ship of Hapag-Lloyd

Aviation 
 Bremen Airport, the international airport of Bremen, Germany
 Bremen (aircraft), the first airplane to cross the Atlantic from east to west
 Air Bremen, a small German airline operating between 1988 and 1990

Other uses 
 University of Bremen, a public university in Bremen, Germany
 Bremen High School (disambiguation)
 Werder Bremen, a football team from Germany
 Bremen Cup, an annual German football cup competition
 Bremen Teater (Copenhagen), Denmark, a venue

See also
 Bremen-Verden, a joint administration of the Duchy of Bremen and the Principality of Verden (1648–1823)
 New Bremen, New York
 New Bremen, Ohio